Khandaker Golam Mostafa was a Bangladesh Nationalist Party politician and the former Member of Parliament of Rangpur-11.

Career 
Mostafa was elected to parliament from Rangpur-11 as a Bangladesh Nationalist Party candidate in 1979. He was a veteran of Bangladesh Liberation war. He served as the General Secretary of Press Club, Rangpur. He was the editor of Dainik Dabanol.

Death 
Mostafa died on 3 September 2020 at Rangpur Medical College Hospital, Rangpur, Bangladesh.

References 

Bangladesh Nationalist Party politicians
1943 births
2020 deaths
2nd Jatiya Sangsad members
Bangladeshi journalists
People from Rangpur District
Rangpur Government College alumni
Carmichael College alumni